The Mexico Trilogy (also known as the Desperado Trilogy on some released DVD products) is a series of American/Mexican contemporary western action films written and directed by Robert Rodriguez. The series' plot tells the continuing story of El Mariachi, a man who painfully lives alone after seeing all of his loved ones die. El Mariachi was portrayed by actors Carlos Gallardo and Antonio Banderas. The films were originally released in theatres from 1993 to 2003, and later on home video as a collection in 2010.

Development
The trilogy began with the 1993 ultra low-budget production of El Mariachi. The film was made on a budget of only US$7,000 using 16-millimeter film, was shot entirely in Mexico with a mostly amateur cast, and was originally intended to go directly to the Mexican home-video market (a process detailed in Rodriguez's book Rebel Without a Crew). Rodriguez got some funds for the film by serving as a human guinea pig to science labs. Other finances came in the form of prize money won by his short student film, Bedhead, at film festival competitions.

Executives at Columbia Pictures liked the film so much that they bought the rights to it for American distribution. They eventually spent several times more than the film's original production budget on 35 millimeter-film transfers, a marketing campaign, and the eventual distribution/release of the film. It was so well received that they eventually chose to finance the second part of the trilogy, Desperado, and subsequently the final chapter, Once Upon a Time in Mexico.

Films

El Mariachi (1993)

El Mariachi travels through Mexico as a musician. He arrives in a small town hoping to find work in the cantinas and clubs. Troubled locals mistake him for a recently escaped convict who has been hunting down his former associates, and killing them with weapons carried in his guitar case. El Mariachi falls in love with a woman who helps hide him, but he sees her killed by those hunting him. He seeks revenge for her death.

Desperado (1995)

The unfortunate adventures of El Mariachi continue, following his quest for love and his thirst for revenge.

Once Upon a Time in Mexico (2003)

A failed coup attempt on the President of Mexico is stopped by the heroic actions of El Mariachi. He sets out to avenge the murder of his wife, and discovers a connection between the marauders and her death.

Television series

El Mariachi (2014)

In August 2013, Sony Pictures Television announced a TV series adaptation of El Mariachi. Filming took place in Mexico with Iván Arana as the lead and Martha Higareda and Julio Brancho in supporting roles. Initially set to premiere on Sony Entertainment Television, the Spanish-language series premiered on AXN across Latin America on March 20, 2014. El Mariachi ran for one season consisting of 71 episodes—airing on MundoFox in the United States and MBC Action in the Middle East.

Cast and crew

Principal cast

Additional crew and production details

Reception

Box office
All three films were made using Rodriguez's "Mariachi-style" of filmmaking in which (according to the back cover of his book Rebel Without a Crew) "creativity, not money, is used to solve problems." Made on low budgets, all three movies have been extremely profitable. El Mariachi was made for $7,000 and grossed more than $2 million in its theatrical release. Desperado was made for $7 million and grossed over $25.5 million in US theaters. Once Upon a Time in Mexico was made for $29 million and grossed over $56.3 million domestically, and an additional $41.0 million worldwide.

Awards and critical reaction
Each installment of the Mexico Trilogy has won various prestigious awards. El Mariachi won the Audience Award at the 1993 Sundance Film Festival and the 1993 Deauville American Film Festival, as well as Best First Feature at the 1994 Independent Spirit Awards. Desperado saw Salma Hayek nominated for Best Supporting Actress at the 1996 Saturn Awards, and was nominated for the Bronze Horse at the 1995 Stockholm Film Festival. Once Upon a Time in Mexico won two Imagen Foundation Awards for performances by Antonio Banderas and Rubén Blades. The film was also nominated for two Satellite Awards, winning Robert Rodriguez an award for Best Song ("Siente Mi Amor") and recognizing Johnny Depp with a nomination for Best Performance by an Actor in a Supporting Role, Comedy or Musical. The movie's impressive stunts landed it two Taurus World Stunt Awards nominations.

References

External links
 
 
 
 
 

 
Columbia Pictures franchises
Sony Pictures franchises
Film series introduced in 1992
Action film series